Philipp Petzschner (born 24 March 1984) is a retired German professional tennis player. He was known for his hard-hitting forehand and bursts of speed around the court. He reached a career-high doubles ranking of world No. 9, which he achieved in April 2011.

Career

Juniors
As a junior Petzschner reached as high as No. 8 in the world in 2002 (and No. 1 in doubles). He reached the semi-finals of the 2001 Jr Wimbledon tournament, and won the 2002 French Open Jr doubles event.

2007
In 2007 US Open qualifying, he defeated fellow German player Benjamin Becker in the first round, before losing to Tommy Haas in four sets.

2008
In 2008 he qualified for Wimbledon, where he fell to Croatian Mario Ančić in the second round.

In October, he captured his first ATP title in Vienna, after he won his qualifying round matches and defeating top seed Stanislas Wawrinka in the first round.

2009
At the 2009 Australian Open, he was defeated by Brian Dabul in the first round. At Roland Garros, Petzschner reached the second round after defeating Canadian Peter Polansky in five sets. There, he lost to Spaniard Fernando Verdasco in straight sets. At the 2009 Gerry Weber Open, he took revenge for that defeat. He won in three sets before losing to Olivier Rochus from Belgium in the second round.
At Wimbledon, he beat Rajeev Ram in the first round, then Mischa Zverev in the second round, but lost to Lleyton Hewitt in the third round. He reached the last sixteen in Washington, D.C. and Montreal. Petzschner was defeated by Juan Carlos Ferrero in the second round of the 2009 US Open after leading two sets to love.

He was not able to defend his title in Vienna as he had to pull out due to an injury.

2010
He lost in the first round of the 2010 Australian Open when comfortably leading two sets to love against Florian Mayer. In February, he won his first doubles title with Jürgen Melzer at the 2010 PBZ Zagreb Indoors. At the same event, he reached the singles semifinal, where he lost to Michael Berrer. In late February, he reached his second semifinal of the season in Memphis, but he was defeated by American John Isner. At the Gerry Weber Open in Halle/Westfalen in June, Petzschner lost to world no. 2 Roger Federer in a tough semifinal encounter. At Wimbledon he competed as the 33rd seed and Petzschner was defeated after a comeback of eventual champion and world no. 1 Rafael Nadal in five sets after leading 2–1 in the third round. In the Wimbledon Championships Doubles, Petzschner won his first Grand Slam title with Jürgen Melzer. They were the first unseeded players to win this competition in five years. This also made Petzschner the first German man to win a Grand Slam tournament since Boris Becker won the Australian Open in 1996.

At the 2010 US Open Petzschner lost in straight sets to Novak Djokovic in the second round.

At the end of August, he qualified for the World Tour Doubles Finals in London with Jürgen Melzer.
They were knocked out in the group stage of the competition, finishing third.

Petzschner finished the year as world no. 57 in singles and world no. 20 in doubles. He earned a career-high prize money of $702,058, with a match record of 21–19 in singles and 22–16 in doubles.

2011

Petzschner and Melzer reached the doubles quarterfinal at the 2011 Australian Open, when they lost to Bob and Mike Bryan. In singles play, Petzschner was defeated in five sets by Jo-Wilfried Tsonga in the first round of the tournament. In Rotterdam, Petzschner won his third doubles title partnering Jürgen Melzer.

The height of Petzschner's season was reached when he and his partner Jürgen Melzer won the US Open Men's Doubles final, defeating the sixth seeded Polish team of Mariusz Fyrstenberg and Marcin Matkowski. A controversy occurred at 2–2 in the second set, when a ball bounced on Petzschner's left shin and the chair umpire ruled the play valid. When asked, Petzschner nodded ambiguously, even though the video replay later confirmed that the ball was returned illegally. Nevertheless, the incident did not affect the match's final result 6–2, 6–2.

Petzschner reached his first singles quarterfinal of the season in Dubai, defeating Andreas Seppi and Philipp Kohlschreiber, before falling to Tomáš Berdych. He represented Germany in the Davis Cup first-round tie against Croatia in Zagreb. Partnering Christopher Kas, he defeated Ivo Karlović and Ivan Dodig in five sets to give Germany a 2–1 lead. In the deciding fifth rubber, Petzschner replaced Florian Mayer and secured Germany's quarterfinal spot with a three-set win against Karlović.

At the 2011 BMW Open in Munich, he reached his first singles semifinal of the season. He defeated Ivan Dodig, Mikhail Youzhny, and Potito Starace, before losing to Florian Mayer. At the World Team Cup in Düsseldorf, Petzschner won the deciding doubles match partnering Philipp Kohlschreiber in the final against Argentina. In singles, he gave Germany a 1–0 lead against Russia, defeating Igor Andreev in straight sets.

Petzschner reached his second career singles final in Halle, on grass. He retired injured while trailing compatriot Kohlschreiber love-two in the second set.

2012
Petzschner reached the finals of the UNICEF Open, losing to David Ferrer in straight sets.

2015
Petzschner failed to qualify for any ATP singles events this year. However, in doubles he and partner Jonathan Erlich achieved success by reaching the Wimbledon semifinal as qualifiers. His year-end doubles ranking was no. 50.

2016
At the beginning of the year Petzschner and partner Alexander Peya got to three finals (Doha, Rotterdam and Acapulco), but lost them all.

In March he reached a quarterfinal of a Masters 1000 tournament for the first time in three and a half years at the Miami Open.

2017
Petzschner won the Swedish Open with partner Julian Knowle.

2018
Petzschner won the title at the Stuttgart Open, partnering Tim Pütz as a wild card entry. In October, he played his last professional match on the tour at the European Open in Antwerp.

Playing style
Petzschner has a powerful serve (up to 230 km/h) and forehand. His slice backhand is very flat and dangerous, which he utilises so much to the extent that he comparably rarely hits a topspin or flat two-handed backhand. He is also an excellent player at the net, which makes him a better doubles player.

Personal life
He married singer Dewi Sulaeman of the pop group Bellini in September 2010. They have one son and 2 daughters.

Grand Slam finals

Doubles: 2 (2 titles)

ATP career finals

Singles: 3 (1 title, 2 runner-ups)

Doubles: 15 (8 titles, 7 runner-ups)

Team competition: 1 (1 title)

ATP Challenger Tour finals

Singles: 5 (1–4)

Doubles: 39 (21–18)

Junior Grand Slam finals

Doubles: 2 (1 title, 1 runner-up)

Performance timelines

Singles

Doubles

Wins over top 10 players

Records
• Record of consecutive five-set Grand Slam matches

References

External links

 
 
 

1984 births
Living people
German male tennis players
Sportspeople from Bayreuth
Tennis players at the 2012 Summer Olympics
Olympic tennis players of Germany
Grand Slam (tennis) champions in men's doubles
French Open junior champions
Grand Slam (tennis) champions in boys' doubles
Wimbledon champions
US Open (tennis) champions
Tennis people from Bavaria